Viktor Ivanovich Korshunov (24 November 1929 – 17 April 2015) was a Soviet and Russian stage and film actor, theater director and pedagogue. People's Artist of the USSR (1984).

Biography
He was born in Moscow on Sukharevskaya Street.

Member of the Communist Party of the Soviet Union since 1959.

He died in Moscow and was buried in the Novodevichy Cemetery.

Selected filmography 
 Early Joys (1956) – Kirill Izvekov
 An Unusual Summer (1957) – Kirill Izvekov
 The Magpie (1958) – Stepan
 On Thin Ice (1966) – Dmitry Dmitriyevich Bragin
 Retribution (1967) – Chief of the military hospital
 Goal! Another Goal! (1968) – Andrei Pavlovich Tamantsev, coach
 Bonivur's Heart (1969) – Boris Lyubansky
 Corps of General Shubnikov (1980) – Army general

Awards and honors 
 Honored Artist of the RSFSR (1961)
 People's Artist of the RSFSR (1969)
 Jubilee Medal "In Commemoration of the 100th Anniversary of the Birth of Vladimir Ilyich Lenin" (1970)
 Order of the October Revolution (1974)
 Order of the Red Banner of Labour (1980)
 Medal "Veteran of Labour" (1984)
 People's Artist of the USSR (1984)
 Order "For Merit to the Fatherland", 4th class (1994)
 Order "For Merit to the Fatherland", 3rd class (1999)
 Order "For Merit to the Fatherland", 2nd class (2005)

References

External links 

 
 Виктор Коршунов — играющий директор

1929 births
2015 deaths
20th-century Russian male actors
21st-century Russian male actors
Communist Party of the Soviet Union members
Male actors from Moscow
Moscow Art Theatre School alumni
Honored Artists of the RSFSR
People's Artists of the RSFSR
People's Artists of the USSR
Recipients of the Order "For Merit to the Fatherland", 2nd class
Recipients of the Order "For Merit to the Fatherland", 3rd class
Recipients of the Order "For Merit to the Fatherland", 4th class
Recipients of the Order of the Red Banner of Labour
Russian drama teachers
Russian male film actors
Russian male stage actors
Russian theatre directors
Soviet drama teachers
Soviet male film actors
Soviet male stage actors
Soviet theatre directors
Burials at Novodevichy Cemetery